Notts may refer to:

 Nottinghamshire
 Notts County FC, an association football club

See also
 Nott (disambiguation)